General elections were held in Togo on 30 December 1979, alongside a constitutional referendum that confirmed the country's status as a one-party state. Gnassingbé Eyadéma, who had led a coup in 1967, was elected President unopposed, whilst the Rally of the Togolese People (the sole legal party) won all 67 seats in the National Assembly as its list of 67 candidates was approved by voters. Voter turnout was reported to be 99.3% in the parliamentary election and 99.4% in the presidential election.

Results

President

National Assembly

References

Togo
General
Elections in Togo
Single-candidate elections
One-party elections
Presidential elections in Togo
Togo